{{DISPLAYTITLE:C15H22N2}}
The molecular formula C15H22N2 may refer to:

 Ethylisopropyltryptamine
 Ethylpropyltryptamine
 2-Me-DET
 5,N-Dimethyl-N-isopropyltryptamine